The Network for Public Policy Studies (NPPS) or Shams is an academic peer-reviewed website, under the supervision of Center for Strategic Studies, dedicated to the study of public policies with an emphasis on Iranian Government's policies. The NPPS publishes articles in Persian and English, covering topics including environmental policy, economic policy, foreign policy, science policy, technology policy, health policy, social policy and cultural policy.

References

External links
Network for Public Policy Studies

2015 establishments in Iran
Public policy in Iran
Iranian websites
Creative Commons-licensed websites
Persian-language websites
Internet properties established in 2015